The New Bilibid Prison (NBP) in Muntinlupa, Metro Manila is the main insular prison designed to house the prison population of the Philippines. It is maintained by the Bureau of Corrections (BuCor) under the Department of Justice. As of October 2022, the NBP housed 29,204 inmates, which exceeds its ideal capacity of 6,345.

In 1940, the Commonwealth government transferred prisoners to the NBP from the Old Bilibid Prison ("Correctional Jail and Military Prison"), in Manila. The remnants of the old facility were repurposed by the City of Manila as its own detention center, known today as Manila City Jail.

Additional land of the NBP Reservation is used for the Bureau of Corrections headquarters.

During Japanese occupation of the Philippines during World War II, Bilibid was a prisoner of war and civilian internee camp where American soldiers and civilians were held by the Japanese. Twelve hundred internees and POWs were freed by the American army on February 4, 1945, during the Battle of Manila.

History
The Old Bilibid Prison, then known as Carcel y Presidio Correccional (Spanish, "Correctional Jail and Military Prison") occupied a rectangular piece of land that was part of the Mayhaligue Estate in the heart of Manila. The old prison was established by the Spanish colonial government on June 25, 1865, via royal decree. It was divided into two sections: the Carcel, which could accommodate 600 inmates; and the Presidio, which could hold 527 prisoners.

Due to increasing crime, the Commonwealth government enacted Commonwealth Act No. 67 and a new prison was built in Muntinlupa on a  land in an area considered at that time to be "remote". Muntinlupa, then a municipality in the province of Rizal, is several miles southeast of downtown Manila, near the shores of Laguna de Bay. Construction began on New Bilibid in 1936 with a budget of one million Philippine pesos. In 1940, the prisoners, equipment and facilities were transferred from Old Bilibid to the new prison. The remnants of the old facility was used by the City of Manila as its detention center. In 1941, the new facility was officially named "New Bilibid Prison".

World War II internee camp

During World War II and the Japanese Occupation of the Philippines, both the Old Bilibid and New Bilibid Prisons were used as Prisoner of War (POW) camps, hospitals for POWs, and transit centers for POWs being transferred to other locations, primarily to Japan. More than 13,000 POWs, the majority of them American, were processed at these Manila area facilities during the war. Included in that total are 500 civilian internees who were moved to Bilibid from the Camp Holmes Internment Camp near Baguio in December 1944. Thousands of POWs who transited Bilibid Prison en route to Japan were killed when the Hell ships on which they were being transported were sunk by American military aircraft or submarines, the Americans being unaware that POWs were on board the ships.

The Old Bilibid prison continued to be used by the Japanese Kempeitai (military police) for holding special prisoners throughout their occupation of Manila and Luzon. General Vicente Lim was among those interned there.

The Battle of Manila began on February 3, 1945, and that evening the civilians in Old Bilibid Prison heard the unmistakable sound of American voices outside the walls. The American soldiers outside, however, seemed unaware of the prisoners inside Bilibid, but had the objective of liberating the 4,000 civilian internees at Santo Tomas Internment Camp two kilometers (one mile) away. The battle near the prison raged all that night, but the next morning the Japanese guards abandoned Bilibid, leaving a message to the POWs and internees that they should avoid leaving Bilibid, and posting a sign at the gate advising "Lawfully released Prisoners of War and internees are quartered here."

The internees hoisted the American flag over Bilibid, but after an explosion nearby the departing Japanese came back to warn them that the flag would draw fire from Japanese artillery. At 7 p.m. on that evening, February 4, 1945, American soldiers from the 37th Ohio National Guard broke through the wall into the compound.

The liberated POWs and internees at Old Bilibid numbered 1,200, including 700 soldiers and 500 civilians. The civilian internees remained in Bilibid for another month until the Battle of Manila concluded with the Japanese defenders wiped out. The internees were then flown to Leyte and from there they were repatriated to the United States. One of the civilian internees described the repatriation process as "being badgered by friends rather than the enemy." The former internees were infuriated at having to promise to pay the U.S. government $275 per person for repatriation. Many of the civilian internees, long-term residents of the Philippines or related to Filipinos, were reluctant to leave, but were pressured to do so by the U.S. military.

Postwar era
From the end of World War II until 1953, Japanese war criminals were held within the prison, under Prison Superintendent Alfredo Bunye.

Martial Law era

The rise of the dictatorship of Ferdinand Marcos saw the establishment of the Sampaguita Rehabilitation Center - later named Camp Sampaguita - within the NBP compound. It served both as the headquarters of the 225th Philippine Constabulary Company, and also as a stockade for Political Prisoners. Sampaguita was the southernmost of four major clusters of concentration camps for political prisoners in the Greater Manila Area at the time, Sampaguita being the "S" in "A, B, C, and S" with the other letters representing Camps Aguinaldo ("A"), Bonifacio ("B"), and Crame ("C").

Contemporary history
On June 5, 2014, Department of Justice Undersecretary Francisco Baraan III, supervising official on the Bureau of Corrections and the NBP said that the National Penitentiary will be moved to Barangay San Isidro in Laur, Nueva Ecija.

In 2022, it was announced that there are plans to relocate the medium and maximum security prisons to Occidental Mindoro and the minimum security inmates to Fort Magsaysay, Nueva Ecija.

Facilities
The New Bilibid Prison consists of three compounds: the maximum security compound, which houses inmates serving a prison sentence of more than 20 years; the medium security compound, which houses those serving less than 20 years; and the minimum security compound, which houses those close to completing their sentence or who are 70 years old and above.

In 1999, Ron Gluckman of Asiaweek wrote that due to the commercial activity and relative freedom of movement in most of the prison, the facility "seems more like a barangay in the Philippines than a prison."

Death penalty

The execution chamber for inmates sentenced to death by electrocution was in Building 14, within the Maximum Security Compound. As of 2015, it is used to house maximum security prisoners. The former lethal injection chamber is now used as the Bureau of Corrections (BuCor) Museum. Seven men were executed by lethal injection between 1999 and 2000.

Gluckman wrote that the men's death row in Building One, was uncharacteristic of the rest of the prison: "The place reeks of gas burners, sewage, sweat and fear."

Recreational facilities
The prisoners pass the time in the basketball court in the penitentiary's gymnasium and are also engaged in the production of handicrafts. Various religious denominations are active in prison ministry, with Mass said daily in the prison's Roman Catholic chapel; a locale of the Iglesia Ni Cristo is also on the prison grounds. Religious groups, such as the Philippine Jesuit Prison Service, Caritas Manila, Seventh-day Adventist Church, and Amazing Grace Christian Ministries, also extend medical services to prisoners. Research participants agree that the use of inmate leaders is an integral component of prison management in the MSC. Inmates can either assume custodial, administrative, and rehabilitation functions.

Educational facilities
Educational facilities inside the compound provide elementary education, high school education, vocational training and adult literacy programs. It also provides a Bachelor's Degree in Commerce. The New Bilibid Prison also houses a talipapâ (small wet and flea market) where prisoners can buy daily commodities.

Katarungan Village
On September 5, 1991, President Corazon C. Aquino issued Presidential Proclamation No. 792, which was amended by Presidential Proclamation No. 120 on December 15, 1992, to the effect that  of land be developed into housing for employees of the Department of Justice and other government agencies. This housing project is known as the Katarungan ("Justice") Village.

Notable inmates
 Amado V. Hernández is a National Artist of the Philippines for Literature who wrote his masterpieces while imprisoned in the facility.
 Actor Robin Padilla converted to Islam and wed in an Islamic ceremony his first wife, Liezl Sicangco, whilst serving a 2-year prison sentence for illegal weapons possession. He was released in 1998 after having been granted pardon by President Fidel Ramos.
 Claire Phillips, an American spy who was awarded the Medal of Freedom in 1951.
 Former Philippine senator Jovito Salonga was imprisoned by the Kempetai in April 1942, during the onset of the Japanese Occupation in World War II.
 Claudio Teehankee, Jr., the son of former Chief Justice Claudio Teehankee, Sr., who was convicted of murder, homicide and attempted murder on October 6, 1995. He was later released in 2008.
 Hubert Webb, the son of former senator Freddie Webb, was convicted on January 6, 2000, for his alleged role in the June 1991 Vizconde Massacre. The Supreme Court later acquitted Webb on December 14, 2010.
 Antonio Sanchez, former mayor of Calauan, Laguna, who was convicted of rape and homicide on March 14, 1995, for his alleged role in the June 1993 murders of Eileen Sarmenta and Allan Gomez.
 General Tomoyuki Yamashita was the commander of the Japanese Imperial Army in the Philippines in 1944. He was incarcerated while undergoing trial for war crimes committed during the Japanese Occupation and was eventually executed by hanging in Los Baños, Laguna on February 23, 1946.
 Jonel Nuezca, perpetrator of the 2020 Tarlac shooting. He died while imprisoned on November 30, 2021.
 Luis Taruc, a communist who pleaded guilty to a charge of rebellion in 1954 and was sentenced to 12 years imprisonment. He was later sentenced to four life terms for additional crimes. He was pardoned in 1968 by then-President Ferdinand Marcos.

See also
2014 New Bilibid Prison raids
New Bilibid Prison drug trafficking scandal
Muntinlupa Sunken Garden
 Naval Base Manila

References

External links
 Images by Gerhard Joren at Getty Images
 "The lethal injection chamber at New Bilibid Prison." February 24, 2004.
 "The lethal injection chamber at New Bilibid Prison." February 24, 2004.
 "Superintendent Venancio Tesoro at the lethal injection chamber at New Bilibid Prison." February 27, 2004.

 
Department of Justice (Philippines)
Prisons in the Philippines
Buildings and structures in Muntinlupa
World War II sites in the Philippines
Japanese prisoner of war and internment camps
World War II internment camps
Military history of the Philippines during World War II